A referendum on the implementation of the Osaka Metropolis Plan was held in Osaka on 1 November 2020. In the event of a "yes" vote, the wards in Osaka City would be reorganized into special wards similar to those in Tokyo. The proposal was defeated by a slim margin of 17,167 votes (1.25%).

References

2020 elections in Japan
Elections in Osaka Prefecture
Osaka Prefecture
Referendums in Japan
2020 referendums
November 2020 events in Japan
Administrative division referendums